Andreas Otterling (born 25 May 1986) is a Swedish athlete who competes in long jump. At the 2015 athletic championships in Prague Otterling won bronze after an 8,06 meter jump.

Competition record

References

Living people
1986 births
Swedish male long jumpers
21st-century Swedish people